Bronze Award may refer to:

 Bronze Award (Girl Scouts of the USA)
 Venturing Bronze award, a former award from the Venturing program of the Boy Scouts of America
 A level of The Duke of Edinburgh's Award

See also 
 
 Bronze (disambiguation)
 Award (disambiguation)
 Bronze medal
 Bronze Medallion (disambiguation)
 Bronze star (disambiguation)